Anundoram Borooah (1850–1889) was an Indian lawyer and scholar of Sanskrit. He was both the first graduate and member of the Indian Civil Service from the state of Assam.

Literary works

Sanskrit classics
 Bhavabhuti's Mahavircharitam, 
 Saraswatikanthabharana,
 Namalinganusasana,
 Janakiramabhashya.

Other works
 Bhavabhuti and His Place in Sanskrit Literature (1878)
 A Practical English-Sanskrit Dictionary (Part I, II and III) (1877–80)
 Higher Sanskrit Grammar: Gender and Syntax (1879) 
 Ancient Geography of India (1880)
 A Companion to the Sanskrit-reading undergraduates of the Calcutta University (1878)
 Comparison of a comprehensive dictionary of all Dialects of Bengal.

References

External links
 Ananda Ram Baruah Flyover's picture

1850 births
1889 deaths
People from Kamrup district
Scholars from Assam
19th-century Indian linguists
Sanskrit writers
Indian Sanskrit scholars